Florin Iordache (born 14 December 1960) is a Romanian Social Democratic Party (PSD) politician who served as Minister of Justice in the Grindeanu Cabinet from 4 January 2017 to 9 February 2017.

He also served as President of the Chamber of Deputies of Romania between 13 June 2016 and 21 December 2016. He has been a member of the Chamber since 2000, representing his native Olt County.

During the 2017 Romanian protests, tens of thousands of people demanded the resignation of Iordache in response to the Justice Ministry's plans to pardon corrupt politicians and decriminalize other offences. Iordache defended the proposals, saying they would help ease pressure on overcrowded jails.

He announced his resignation as Justice Minister on 9 February 2017, amid anti-government protests.

He is currently heading a special parliamentary commission discussing a judicial overhaul that is a threat to the judiciary's independence.

References

1960 births
Living people
People from Caracal, Romania
Members of the Chamber of Deputies (Romania)
Presidents of the Chamber of Deputies (Romania)
Romanian Ministers of Justice
Social Democratic Party (Romania) politicians